Thorne is the name of two hamlets in north Cornwall, England, United Kingdom. One is on the A3073 road near Bude and the other near Whitstone. Thorne, Whitstone, was a manor in medieval times and had in 1086 land for one plough and 20 acres of pasture.

References

Hamlets in Cornwall
Manors in Cornwall